Vladimir Belov (1906–1989) was a Russian pianist and teacher.

A student of Felix Blumenfeld, he launched a successful career as a concert pianist.

As a teacher in the Moscow Conservatory, he was known to be very soft-spoken and lenient with students, whom he taught as a group (his entire class attended each lesson, taking turns at the piano). Among his students were Aleksandr Baltin  and Edison Denisov. He also edited a few Russian sheet music editions (typically with many fingering options).

A rare LP recording of Belov is available in the Melodya label, titled "Pupils of Felix Blumenfeld". It features recordings of Maria Grinberg, Simon Barere, Vladimir Horowitz and Belov (playing pieces by Blumenfeld). Although short, this recording attests to his being a formidable pianist.

References

Russian classical pianists
Male classical pianists
1906 births
1989 deaths
20th-century classical pianists
20th-century Russian male musicians